Rohinton T Kamakaka is a professor in the Department of Molecular Cell and Developmental Biology at the University of California at Santa Cruz.  Prior to that, he was Unit Chief at the National Institutes of Health in Bethesda, Maryland. He received his PhD degree from the University of Cambridge, U.K.

References

University of California, Santa Cruz faculty
American molecular biologists
Alumni of the University of Cambridge
Living people
Parsi people
Year of birth missing (living people)